Arhbarite (IMA symbol: Arh) is a copper magnesium arsenate mineral with the chemical formula CuMg(AsO)(OH). It is named after its type locality, the Arhbar mine in Ouarzazate Province in Drâa-Tafilalet, Morocco.

References

External links 
 Arhbarite data sheet
 Arhbarite on the Handbook of Mineralogy

Copper(II) minerals
Magnesium minerals
Arsenate minerals
Hydrates
Minerals described in 1982